Inger-Marie Ytterhorn (18 September 1941 – 30 March 2021) was a Norwegian politician for the Progress Party.

Political career
Ytterhorn was elected to the Norwegian Parliament from Hordaland in 1989, but was not re-elected in 1993. She later served in the position of deputy representative during the terms 1993–1997 and 1997–2001.

Her husband Bjørn Erling Ytterhorn was also a member of the Norwegian Parliament.

She was a member of the Norwegian Nobel Committee, the body that awards The Nobel Peace Prize, for 18 years, from 2000 to 2017.

Awards 
2003 – Fjøslykta, an honorary prize awarded by the Progress Party.

Death
Ytterhorn died on 30 March 2021, 79 years old.

References

External links

1941 births
2021 deaths
Progress Party (Norway) politicians
Members of the Storting
Women members of the Storting
20th-century Norwegian politicians